Dahil sa Pag-ibig (International title: For Love or Money / ) is a 2019 Philippine television drama crime series broadcast by GMA Network. Directed by Ricky Davao, it stars Sanya Lopez. It premiered on May 20, 2019 on the network's Afternoon Prime line up replacing Inagaw na Bituin. The series concluded on October 4, 2019, with a total of 100 episodes. It was replaced by Madrasta in its timeslot.

The series is originally titled as Blood Money. The series is streaming online on YouTube.

Premise
Eldon Corpuz, an overseas Filipino worker in Saudi Arabia commits a crime that will land him in jail. His wife Mariel Corpuz, who lives in the Philippines is desperate to earn blood money for the bail of her husband. Portia Reyes, the wife of Eldon's employer, is bent on putting Eldon in jail. While Mariel's former lover Gary Sandoval, offers an indecent proposal to Mariel.

Cast and characters

Lead cast
 Sanya Lopez as Mariel Fajardo Corpuz

Supporting cast
 Benjamin Alves as Eldon Corpuz
 Winwyn Marquez as Portia Reyes Kahlaf
 Pancho Magno as Gary Sandoval
 Dominic Roco as Roger
 Devon Seron as Chin-Chin Fajardo
 Kelley Day as Alison
 Tetchie Agbayani as Clara Corpuz
 Rez Cortez as Pablo "Pabs" Sandoval
 Sandy Andolong as Nanette Fajardo

Guest cast
 Lianne Valentin as Madie Fajardo 
 Charles Jacob Briz as Jun Jun Fajardo
 Teptep Mendoza as Justine F. Corpuz
 Rich Asuncion as Janet
 Janna Trias as Diding
 Arrian Labios as Goon
 Bernard Laxa as Goon
 Mark Malana as Police
 Sheen Gener as Inmate
 Jhoana Marie Tan as Cindy
 Catherine Remperas as Evie
 Jackie Rice as Mercedes Reyes / Mylene Buenaventura
 Jeff Carpio as Tomas

Production
Actor Rocco Nacino was initially hired to appear in the series as Eldon Corpus. Nacino was later removed from the show by GMA Network, and hired to appear in the drama series Descendants of the Sun: The Philippine Adaptation. Benjamin Alves served as his replacement.

Accolades

References

External links
 
 

2019 Philippine television series debuts
2019 Philippine television series endings
Filipino-language television shows
GMA Network drama series
Murder in television
Philippine crime television series
Television shows set in the Philippines